Cedar Grove High School may refer to:

Cedar Grove High School (Georgia), Ellenwood, Georgia
Cedar Grove High School (New Jersey), Cedar Grove, New Jersey
Cedar Grove Preparatory Academy, Prichard, Alabama
Cedar Grove School (Old Bridge Township, New Jersey), listed on the NRHP in Middlesex County, New Jersey
Cedar Grove School, Murfreesboro, Tennessee
Cedar Grove-Belgium High School, Cedar Grove, Wisconsin

See also
 Grove High School (disambiguation)